Joseph Jules Thomas Prinsen (born 9 June 1942) is a Dutch actor, television presenter, singer and writer. He performed in the popular Dutch television programmes De stratemakeropzeeshow, Het Klokhuis, and De Zevensprong, and he also presented the quiz show Met het mes op tafel. He was invested as an Officer of the Order of Orange-Nassau in 2004.

Biography 
Prinsen was born in Vught. His father, Claudius Prinsen (1896–1952), was mayor of Breda and Roosendaal. After graduating from the Toneelschool Amsterdam, Prinsen debuted as a stage actor in 1969 in the play De kleine parade, directed by Wim Sonneveld.

In the early 1970s, Aart Staartjes created the children's television programme De stratemakeropzeeshow with lead roles for Wieteke van Dort, Prinsen and himself. It was a popular and occasionally controversial programme that introduced children to various topics. Prinsen became well known in the Netherlands for playing a character called Erik Engerd in this show. De stratemakeropzeeshow was followed in 1979 by J.J. De Bom voorheen De Kindervriend, in which Van Dort, Staartjes and Prinsen also played the lead roles. Prinsen played the role of Jan J. de Bom, the owner of a toy shop.

In 1982, he played a role in the television series De Zevensprong, based on the book by Tonke Dragt. Prinsen plays various roles in the educational children's programma Het Klokhuis since the early 1990s. He was the presenter of the quiz show Met het mes op tafel from 1997 until 2015.

He has written columns for local newspapers, and he has also written pieces for magazines about cycling and bridge. In March 2007, he published De scharrelaar, a collection of diary excerpts and columns he wrote. A year later, he published a book about bridge, titled Een goede speler is niet eerlijk.

Bibliography 
 De scharrelaar (2007)
 Een goede speler is niet eerlijk (2008)
 Mijn vrouw pikt zeepjes (2020)
 Na Emma (2021)

References

External links 

 

1942 births
Dutch television presenters
Dutch children's television presenters
Dutch male television actors
Dutch male stage actors
Dutch male radio actors
Dutch writers
Dutch male singers
Officers of the Order of Orange-Nassau
People from Vught
Living people